William Howard Kershaw, Jr. (born December 15, 1983) is a former American football linebacker who is currently a free agent. He was signed by the Kansas City Chiefs as an undrafted free agent in 2006. He played college football at Maryland.

Kershaw has also been a member of the Philadelphia Eagles, Houston Texans, Denver Broncos and New Orleans Saints.

External links
Denver Broncos bio
Maryland Terrapins bio

1983 births
Living people
People from Pinehurst, North Carolina
American football linebackers
Maryland Terrapins football players
Kansas City Chiefs players
Philadelphia Eagles players
Houston Texans players
Denver Broncos players
New Orleans Saints players
Miami Dolphins players